Army Public Schools (APS) constitute a network of private educational institutions established for the purpose of providing education to the children of Indian armed forces personnel. With a nationwide presence spanning 137 schools, it is one of the largest chains of schools in India. The Army Welfare Education Society (AWES), which was founded in 1983, oversees the management of the APS system, and has established over 135 Army public schools and 249 Army pre-primary schools across the country, as well as several institutions of higher education.

Since their inception, APSs have witnessed significant growth, with a student population of around 20,000 in 1987 expanding to a mammoth system with a current student strength of approximately 2.3 lakh and 8,500 teaching staff. On average, 5,000 students are added to the APS system every year.

Overview
In general, the management of schools is overseen by the regional commands of the army, and the educational pattern followed is that of the Central Board of Secondary Education (CBSE). Admission priority is given to children of army personnel. Additionally, each Army school is led by a chairman, who is a senior Indian Army officer holding the rank of brigadier, and a patron, who holds the rank of major general.

List of Army Public Schools of India (not all-inclusive) 

 Army Public School, Amritsar
 Army Goodwill School, Potha, Jammu and Kashmir
 Army Public School, Agartala
 Army Public School, Agra
 Army Public School, Ahmedabad Cantt
 Army Public School, Ahmednagar
 Army Public School, Ambala Cantt.
 Army Public School, New Cantt. Allahabad (Prayagraj)
 Army Public School, Red Eagle Division, Old Cantt. Allahabad (Prayagraj)
 Army Public School, ASC Center and College
 Army Public School, Babina
 Army Public School, Bagrakote
 Army Public School, Ballygunge
 Army Public School, Bareilly
 Army Public School, Barrackpore
 Army Public School, Basistha
 Army Public School, Beas
 Army Public School, Bangalore
 Army Public School, Bengdubi
 Army Public School, Bhopal
 Army Public School, Bhuj
 Army Public School, Bikaner
 army public school, shillong
 Army Public School, Binnaguri
 Army Public School, Bolarum
 Army Public School, Cannanore
 Army Public School, Chandimandir
 Army Public School, Clement town, Dehradun
 Army Public School, Chennai.
 Army Public School, Dagshai
 Army Public School, Danapur Cantt
 Army Public School, Damana, J&K
 Army Public School, Dehu Road
 Army Public School, Delhi Road
 Army Public School, Delhi Cantt
 Army Public School, Devlali
 Army Public School, Dhaula Kuan
 Army Public School, Dhrangadhra
 Army Public School, Dighi
 Army Public School, Dinjan
 Army Public School, Fatehgarh Cantt
 Army Public School, Faizabad
 Army public School, Faridkot
 Army Public School, Fazilka
 Army Public School, Ferozpur Cantt
 Army Public School, Gangtok
 Army Public School, Gopalpur Cantt
 Army Public School, Tibri Gurdaspur
 Army Public School, Hisar
 Army Public School, Jabalpur
 Army Public School, Jaipur
 Army Public School, Jhansi Cantt
 Army Public School, Jodhpur
 Army Public School, Jorhat
 Army Public School, Kaluchak, J&K
 Army Public School, Kamptee
 Army Public School,  NDA , Khadakwasla
 Army Public School, Kamraj Road
 Army Public School, Kashipur
 Army Public School, Kirkee
 Army Public School, Kolkata
 Army Public School, Lalgarh Jattan
 Army Public School, Lansdowne
 Army Public School, Kunraghat, Gorakhpur
 Army Public School, Leh, Phyang.
 Army Public School, Lucknow,  Nehru Road
 Army Public School, Lucknow, Lal Bahadur Shastri Marg
 Army Public School, Lucknow, SP Marg
 Army Public School, Mamun Cantt
 Army Public School, Mathura Cantt
 Army Public School, Meerut Cantt
 Army Public School, Mhow
 Army Public School, Mumbai
 Army Public School, Nabha
 Army Public School, Nahaan
 Army Public School, Namkun Cantt
 Army public School, Narangi
 Army Public School, Nasirabad
 Army public School, Noida
 Army Public School, Panagarh
 Army Public School, Parachute Regiment Training Centre, Karnataka
 Army Public School, Patiala
 Army Public School, Potha
 Army Public School, Pathankot
 Army Public School, Pune
 Army Public School, Raiwala
 Army Public School Rangapahar
 Army Public School, Rorkee
 Army Public School, Samba.
 Army Public School, Sagar
 Army Public School, Shankar Vihar
 Army Public School, Shillong
 Army Public School, Sukna
 Army Public School, Suratgarh
 Army Public School, Tenga Valley
 Army Public School, Tezpur
 Army Public School, Tibri
 Army Public School, Trivandrum
 Army Public School, Udhampur, J&K
 Army Public School, Umroi Cantt
 Army Public School, Varanasi
 Army Public School, Yol Cantt
 General B. C. Joshi Army Public School, Pithoragarh
 Army Public School, Rakhmuthi, J&K
 Army Public School, Jammu cantt, J&K
 Army Public School, Ratnuchak, J&K
 Army Public School, Akhnoor, J&K
 Army Public School, Sunjuwan, J&K
 Army Public School, Miran sahib, J&K
 Army Public School, Dhar road, Udhampur, J&K
 Army Public School, Srinagar, J&K
 Army Public School, Samba, J&K
 Army Public School, Bathinda
 Army Public School, Unchi Bassi
 Army Public School, Janglot, J&K
 Army Public School - RK Puram ,Secunderabad

References

External links
 

 
Central Board of Secondary Education
Co-educational schools in India
1974 establishments in India